The following outline is provided as an overview of and topical guide to Rio de Janeiro:

Rio de Janeiro – capital and most populous city of Rio de Janeiro state, and the second most populous city in Brazil,  Rio de Janeiro was founded in 1565 by the Portuguese as part of the Portuguese Empire. It was the capital and political center of Brazil, where events like the Proclamation of the Republic took place. Brasília overtook Rio de Janeiro as  the new capital of Brazil in 1960. Rio de Janeiro is known for its cultural riches, such as Carnival, samba and bossa nova, beaches such as Copacabana and Ipanema, and also for the Christ the Redeemer statue overlooking the city. Major education institutions include the Federal University of Rio de Janeiro, the Rio de Janeiro State University, and Colégio Pedro II.

General reference 
 Common English name(s): Rio de Janeiro
 Official English name(s): Rio de Janeiro
 Adjectival(s): Carioca
 Demonym(s): Carioca

Geography of Rio de Janeiro 

Geography of Rio de Janeiro
 Rio de Janeiro is:
 a city
 capital of Rio de Janeiro (state)
 Population of Rio de Janeiro: 7,456,682 
 Area of Rio de Janeiro: 1,221 km2 (486.5 sq mi)

Location of Rio de Janeiro 

 Rio de Janeiro is situated within the following regions:
 Southern Hemisphere and Western Hemisphere
 South America (outline) 
 Brazil (outline)
 Southeast Region, Brazil
 Rio de Janeiro (state)
 Greater Rio de Janeiro
 Time zone(s): 
 BRT (UTC−03)

Environment of Rio de Janeiro 

 Climate of Rio de Janeiro
 Environment of Rio de Janeiro
 Carioca Mosaic

Natural geographic features of Rio de Janeiro 

 

 Beaches in Rio de Janeiro
 Arpoador
 Barra da Tijuca
 Botafogo
 Copacabana
 Ipanema
 Leblon
 Pontal
 Praia do Abricó
 Recreio dos Bandeirantes
 Islands in Rio de Janeiro
 Governador Island
 Ilha das Cobras
 Ilha Fiscal
 Ilhas Cagarras
 Paquetá Island
 Villegagnon Island
 Lagoons in Rio de Janeiro
 Rodrigo de Freitas Lagoon
 Mountains in Rio de Janeiro
 Corcovado
 Pedra da Gávea
 Sugarloaf Mountain
 Restingas in Rio de Janeiro
 Restinga da Marambaia
 Rivers in Rio de Janeiro
 Acari River
 Carioca River
 Maracanã River

Areas of Rio de Janeiro 

 North Zone
 South Zone
 West Zone
 Zona Central

Districts of Rio de Janeiro

Neighbourhoods in Rio de Janeiro 

 Botafogo
 Centro
 Copacabana
 Ipanema
 Leblon

Locations in Rio de Janeiro 

 Tourist attractions in Rio de Janeiro
 Museums in Rio de Janeiro
 Shopping areas and markets
 World Heritage Sites in Rio de Janeiro
Valongo Wharf

Aqueducts in Rio de Janeiro 

 Carioca Aqueduct

Bridges in Rio de Janeiro 

 Ponte do Saber
 Rio–Niterói Bridge

Cultural and exhibition centres in Rio de Janeiro 

 Riocentro

Forts in Rio de Janeiro 

 Fort Copacabana
 Fortaleza de Nossa Senhora da Conceição
 Fortaleza de São João

Monuments and memorials in Rio de Janeiro 

 Christ the Redeemer
 Monument to the Dead of World War II

Museums and art galleries in Rio de Janeiro 

Museums in Rio de Janeiro
 Civil Police Museum
 Museu Aeroespacial
 Museu da Imagem e do Som do Rio de Janeiro
 Museu Nacional de Belas Artes
 Museum of Life
 Museum of Modern Art
 Museum of Tomorrow
 National Historical Museum
 National Museum of Brazil

Palaces and villas in Rio de Janeiro 

 Catete Palace
 Paço de São Cristóvão
 Paço Imperial
 Palácio Laranjeiras
 Palácio Monroe

Parks and gardens in Rio de Janeiro 

 Campo de Santana
 Flamengo Park
 Marapendi Municipal Nature Park
 Parque das Ruínas
 Parque Lage
 Passeio Público
 Pedra Branca State Park
 Quinta da Boa Vista
 Reserva de Marapendi
 Rio de Janeiro Botanical Garden
 Tijuca Forest

Public squares in Rio de Janeiro 

 Cinelândia
 General Osório Square
 Largo do Boticário
 Largo do Machado
 Praça Quinze de Novembro

Religious buildings in Rio de Janeiro 

 Candelária Church
 Nossa Senhora do Monserrate do Rio de Janeiro
 Old Cathedral of Rio de Janeiro
 Presbyterian Cathedral of Rio de Janeiro
 Rio de Janeiro Cathedral
 Rio de Janeiro Brazil Temple

Secular buildings in Rio de Janeiro 

 Centro Empresarial Internacional Rio
 Edificio do Jornal A Noite
 Gustavo Capanema Palace
 Hanging Garden of Valongo
 National Observatory
 Petrobras Headquarters
 Rio Sul Center
 Torre Almirante
 Valongo Observatory
 Ventura Corporate Towers

Streets in Rio de Janeiro 

 Avenida Atlântica
 Avenida Brasil
 Avenida Presidente Vargas
 Avenida Rio Branco
 Avenida Vieira Souto
 Rua General Urquiza
 Rua Tonelero
 Rua Uruguaiana

Theatres in Rio de Janeiro 

 Teatro Carlos Gomes
 Teatro dos Sete
 Teatro João Caetano
 Teatro Villa-Lobos
 Theatro Municipal

Demographics of Rio de Janeiro 

Demographics of Rio de Janeiro

Government and politics of Rio de Janeiro 

Politics of Rio de Janeiro
 Administrative Regions in Rio de Janeiro
 Mayors of Rio de Janeiro
 Municipal Chamber of Rio de Janeiro
 International relations of Rio de Janeiro
 Twin towns and sister cities of Rio de Janeiro

Law and order in Rio de Janeiro 

 Law enforcement in Rio de Janeiro
 Civil Police of Rio de Janeiro State
 Military Police of Rio de Janeiro State

History of Rio de Janeiro 

History of Rio de Janeiro

History of Rio de Janeiro, by period or event 

Timeline of Rio de Janeiro
 Rio de Janeiro during the Portuguese Empire (1565–1815)
 São Sebastião do Rio de Janeiro founded by the Portuguese (1 March 1565)
  The colonial capital in Portuguese America is transferred to Rio de Janeiro from Salvador (27 January 1763)
 The city becomes capital of Kingdom of Portugal (1808)
 Rio de Janeiro during the United Kingdom of PBA (1815–1822)
  Rio becomes capital of the United Kingdom of Portugal, Brazil and the Algarves (1815)
 Rio de Janeiro during the Empire of Brazil (1822–1889)
 After the declaration of Brazil's independence in 1822, Rio de Janeiro becomes the capital of the new empire (1822–1889)
 Rio de Janeiro during the Republican period (1889–present)
 The city becomes capital of the republic of Brazil (1889)
 The Brazilian capital is officially moved to Brasília (21 April 1960)
 A presidential decree removes the city's federative status and merges it with the State of Rio de Janeiro, with the city of Rio de Janeiro replacing Niterói as the state's capital, and establishing the Rio de Janeiro Metropolitan Region (1975)

History of Rio de Janeiro, by subject 

 Battle of Rio de Janeiro (1567)
 Battle of Rio de Janeiro (1711)
 Treaty of Rio de Janeiro (1825)
 Proclamation of the Republic (1889)

Culture of Rio de Janeiro 

Culture of Rio de Janeiro

Arts in Rio de Janeiro

Architecture of Rio de Janeiro 
Architecture in Rio de Janeiro
 Buildings in Rio de Janeiro
 Tallest buildings in Rio de Janeiro

Cinema of Rio de Janeiro 

 Rio de Janeiro International Film Festival

Literature of Rio de Janeiro 

Literature in Rio de Janeiro
 Writers from Rio de Janeiro
 Machado de Assis
 Paulo Coelho

Music of Rio de Janeiro 

 
Music of Rio de Janeiro
 Music festivals and competitions in Rio de Janeiro
 Rock in Rio
 Music venues in Rio de Janeiro
 Cidade das Artes
 KM de Vantagens Hall
 Theatro Municipal
 Musical ensembles in Rio de Janeiro
 
 Musicians from Rio de Janeiro
 Oscar Lorenzo Fernández
 Heitor Villa-Lobos
 Songs about Rio de Janeiro
 Cidade Maravilhosa
 Dance from Rio de Janeiro
 Maxixe

Theatre of Rio de Janeiro 

Theatre in Rio de Janeiro

Visual arts of Rio de Janeiro 

 
Rio de Janeiro in art / Paintings of Rio de Janeiro

Art in Rio de Janeiro
 Imperial Academy of Fine Arts
 Escola Nacional de Belas Artes
 Public art in Rio de Janeiro
 Looking Into My Dreams, Awilda

Events in Rio de Janeiro
 Rio Fashion Week
Festivals in Rio de Janeiro
 Rio de Janeiro festivals
 Brazilian Carnival
 Rio Carnival
Languages of Rio de Janeiro
 Brazilian Portuguese
 Carioca
Media in Rio de Janeiro
 Newspapers in Rio de Janeiro
O Dia
O Globo
 Radio and television in Rio de Janeiro
 Rede Globo
People from Rio de Janeiro
People from Rio de Janeiro
 Fernando Henrique Cardoso
 Paulo Coelho
 Oscar Niemeyer
 Nelson Piquet
 Ronaldo

Religion in Rio de Janeiro 
Religion in Rio de Janeiro

Sports in Rio de Janeiro 

 Football in Rio de Janeiro
 Association football in Rio de Janeiro
Football teams in Rio de Janeiro
Campeonato Carioca
Botafogo
Flamengo
Fluminense
Vasco da Gama
 Sports competitions in Rio de Janeiro
 2007 Pan American Games
 2014 FIFA World Cup Final
 2016 Summer Olympics
 2016 Summer Paralympics
 Rio Open
 Rio Pro
 Sports venues in Rio de Janeiro
 Barra Olympic Park
Future Arena
Olympic Aquatics Stadium
Olympic Tennis Centre
 Copacabana Stadium
 Estádio Olímpico Nilton Santos
 Ginásio do Maracanãzinho
 Hipódromo da Gávea
 Jeunesse Arena
 Maracanã Stadium
 Olympic Golf Course
 Sambadrome Marquês de Sapucaí

Economy and infrastructure of Rio de Janeiro 

Economy of Rio de Janeiro
 Communications in Rio de Janeiro
 Financial services in Rio de Janeiro
 Bradesco Seguros
 Rio de Janeiro Stock Exchange
 Hotels and resorts in Rio de Janeiro
 Astoria Palace Hotel
 Copacabana Hotel Residência
 Hilton Rio de Janeiro Copacabana
 Hotel Atlantico Praia
 Hotel Glória
 Hotel Nacional Rio
 Marina All Suites Hotel
 Rio Othon Palace
 Sheraton Grand Rio Hotel & Resort
 Shopping malls and markets in Rio de Janeiro
 Barra Shopping
 CasaShopping
 Norte Shopping
 Tourism in Rio de Janeiro
 Tourist attractions in Rio de Janeiro
Vista Chinesa

Transportation in Rio de Janeiro 

Public transport in Rio de Janeiro
 Air transport in Rio de Janeiro
 Airports in Rio de Janeiro 
 Rio de Janeiro–Galeão International Airport
 Santos Dumont Airport
 Cable transport in Rio de Janeiro
 Sugarloaf Cable Car
 Teleférico da Providência
 Teleférico do Alemão 
 Maritime transport in Rio de Janeiro
 Ferry
Praça Quinze ferry terminal
 Port of Rio de Janeiro 
 Road transport in Rio de Janeiro
 Buses in Rio de Janeiro
List of Rio de Janeiro BRT stations 
 Cycling in Rio de Janeiro
 Bike Rio
 Roads in Rio de Janeiro
Arco Metropolitano do Rio de Janeiro

Rail transport in Rio de Janeiro 

Rail transport in Rio de Janeiro
 Corcovado Rack Railway
 Railway stations in Rio de Janeiro
 Central do Brasil
  Rio de Janeiro Metro
 Lines
Line 1
Line 2
Line 4
Stations
 SuperVia
 List of SuperVia stations
 Trams in Rio de Janeiro
 Rio de Janeiro Light Rail
Santa Teresa Tram

Education in Rio de Janeiro 

Education in Rio de Janeiro
 List of Rio de Janeiro schools, colleges, universities and research centers
 Universities and colleges in Rio de Janeiro
 Federal University of Rio de Janeiro
 Rio de Janeiro State University
 Research institutes in Rio de Janeiro
 Instituto Nacional de Matemática Pura e Aplicada
 Oswaldo Cruz Foundation

See also 

 Outline of geography

References

External links 

Rio de Janeiro
Rio de Janeiro